Moral de Calatrava is a municipality in Ciudad Real, Castile-La Mancha, Spain. It is a municipality within the Order of Calatrava in 1212.

References

Municipalities in the Province of Ciudad Real